Arenibacter algicola is a Gram-negative, hydrocarbon-degrading and strictly aerobic bacterium from the genus Arenibacter. Arenibacter algicola uses polycyclic aromatic hydrocarbons as only sources fore carbon and energy.

References

External links
Type strain of Arenibacter algicola at BacDive -  the Bacterial Diversity Metadatabase

Flavobacteria
Bacteria described in 2014